Morning Yawn  is a 1913 painting by the Norwegian artist Edvard Munch.

Detail
The painting shows a nude woman sitting on the edge of her bed and yawning.

See also
List of paintings by Edvard Munch

References

1913 paintings
Paintings by Edvard Munch
Paintings in Bergen